Li Deliang (Chinese: 李德亮; born September 19, 1967) is a retired male diver from PR China. He competed at the 1988 Seoul Olympic Games, and won the bronze medal in Men's 3m Springboard event.

Now coaches at El Monte Aquatic center.

References
 

1967 births
Chinese male divers
Olympic bronze medalists for China
Divers at the 1988 Summer Olympics
Olympic divers of China
Living people
Olympic medalists in diving
Asian Games medalists in diving
Sportspeople from Guangzhou
People from Shantou
Divers at the 1990 Asian Games
Medalists at the 1988 Summer Olympics
Asian Games gold medalists for China
Asian Games silver medalists for China
Medalists at the 1990 Asian Games
Universiade medalists in diving
Universiade gold medalists for China
Medalists at the 1987 Summer Universiade
Medalists at the 1991 Summer Universiade
Medalists at the 1993 Summer Universiade
20th-century Chinese people
21st-century Chinese people